Thomas Albert Wells (27 December 1883 – 16 January 1959) was an Australian rules footballer who played with Fitzroy in the Victorian Football League (VFL).

Notes

External links 

1883 births
1959 deaths
Australian rules footballers from Victoria (Australia)
Fitzroy Football Club players